Girard High School is a public high school near Girard, Ohio, United States. It is the only high school in the Girard City School District. Athletic teams compete as the Girard Indians in the Ohio High School Athletic Association as a member of the All-American Conference.

OHSAA State Championships

 Boys Basketball – 1993 
 Boys Cross Country – 1998, 2000 
 Girls Track and Field – 1980

Notes and references

External links
 District Website

High schools in Trumbull County, Ohio
Public high schools in Ohio